Hola Chicuelos is the third album by Plastilina Mosh, a band from Monterrey, Mexico. It was released in 2003 via EMI.

The album was nominated for a Latin Grammy, in the "Best Alternative Music Album" category.

Critical reception
OC Weekly wrote that "P. Mosh ventures across the sampling galaxy guided by an anarchistic aesthetic that pours upright bass solos, clamorous rawk gratings and Japanese bizarro-pop over some of the most flighty electronica since Odelay-era Beck." The Miami New Times wrote that "the group shows that it's possible to blend disco-era romps, funky and jazzy beats inspired by TV shows, easy-listening grooves, chillout formulas, and ironic rock renditions."

Track listing 
 Cosmic Lelos
 Peligroso Pop
 Naranjada
 Decatlón
 Pekin Jazz
 Garret Club
 Magic Fever
 Houston
 Grooveman
 Celeste
 Aló
 Te Lo Juro Por Madonna
 Keepin' Strong
 Pinche Stereo Band
 Shake Your Pubis
 Enzo
 Oxidados
 Outro

Personnel
Jonaz Gonzalez
Alejandro Rosso

References

2003 albums
Plastilina Mosh albums